Whitehouse station may refer to:

Whitehouse Station, New Jersey, a community in New Jersey, United States
Whitehouse railway station (Northern Ireland), a former station in Newton Abbey, Antrim, Northern Ireland
Whitehouse railway station (Scotland), a former station in Whitehouse, Aberdeenshire, Scotland
White House station, in Whitehouse Station, New Jersey, United States

See also
Whitehouse (disambiguation)